"Wrong Side of the Tracks" may refer to:

The idiom wrong side of the tracks, describing places  divided by railroad tracks where poorer people often live
Wrong Side of the Tracks, a Spanish television series known in Spanish as Entrevías
"Wrong Side of the Tracks", a mission in Grand Theft Auto: San Andreas
"Wrong Side of the Tracks", an episode of American television series Boy Meets World
"Wrong Side of the Tracks", a song recorded by Leroy Van Dyke
"Wrong Side of the Tracks", a 2005 video by Johnny Hazzard
"Wrong Side of the Tracks", a song by Biohazard from No Holds Barred
"Wrong Side of the Tracks", a song by Strung Out from Suburban Teenage Wasteland Blues
"Wrong Side of da Tracks", a song by Artifacts from Between a Rock and a Hard Place